Melbourne Central railway station is an underground station on the electrified railway network in Melbourne, Australia. It is one of three underground stations on the City Loop, which runs through the north and east of the Melbourne CBD. 

The station is located under La Trobe Street, between Swanston and Elizabeth Streets, on the northern edge of the central business district (CBD). The station is named after the Melbourne Central Shopping Centre, which it is beneath. Until 1997 the station was known as Museum station.

It feeds into Melbourne's main metro network station, Flinders Street, and also Southern Cross, Melbourne's main regional terminus. In 2017/2018, it was the third-busiest station on the Melbourne metropolitan rail network, with 15.859 million passenger movements.

History
The station was built using cut and cover construction. In December 1973, to permit excavation of the station, La Trobe Street and its tram tracks were temporarily relocated to the south, onto the site of what is now the Melbourne Central Shopping Centre, and moved back on completion of the work in 1978. Seven layers of struts were used to support the excavation, with 2,600 tonnes of steel temporary supports required.

The station was designed by architectural firm Perrott Lyon Mathieson, with initial layout by associate David Simpson, followed by detailed design by Graeme Butler. The design included the two pairs of platforms, a spacious concourse directly under La Trobe Street, with entries facing the Elizabeth Street and Swanston Street corners. The Swanston Street corner included a set of raised circular platforms above the entry; during a Royal Visit, Queen Elizabeth was shown around the not yet operational station on 28 May 1980, and unveiled a plaque naming it the Queen Elizabeth Plaza.

The station was finally opened on 24 January 1981, and was named Museum, after the adjacent National Museum of Victoria and Science Museum of Victoria, in the State Library of Victoria complex on the opposite side of Swanston Street. It was the first station to open on the City Loop. Initially, the station was only used by trains on the Burnley and Caulfield groups, using platforms 2 and 4, with services from the Clifton Hill group beginning to use platform 1 on 31 October 1982, and trains from the Northern group beginning to use platform 3 on 1 May 1984. The Elizabeth Street entrance to the station opened on 5 April 1982.

The adjoining Melbourne Central Shopping Centre opened in 1991, being built around the existing escalators to street level, with only minor integration between the station concourse and shopping centre. The station was renamed after the shopping centre on 16 February 1997, and a few months later on July 13, the National Museum of Victoria closed at the State Library site, in preparation for its relocation to Carlton, where it reopened as the Melbourne Museum in 2000.

The station concourse was extensively redeveloped in 2002/2003, as part of a redevelopment of the shopping centre, integrating it into the complex. The direct escalators from the concourse to Swanston Street closed in November 2003, and were replaced by escalators rising into the atrium under the cone in the centre of the shopping centre, making the path for rail passengers more convoluted. The concourse under La Trobe Street was integrated into the shopping centre with the installation of numerous shops.

In 2025, as part of the Metro Tunnel project, the Pakenham, Cranbourne and Sunbury lines will cease to stop at Melbourne Central. However, they will use the connected State Library station when it opens with the Metro Tunnel.

Facilities
Melbourne Central has an underground concourse and two levels of platforms below it (2 island platforms with four faces and tracks). Each platform serves a separate group of rail lines that leave the Loop and radiate out into the city's suburbs. At peak times, with a train arriving every 2.5 minutes, the station has a passenger flow of 30,000 per hour. Three elevators were initially provided, as well as 21 escalators. Melbourne Central is a Premium Station, meaning that it is staffed from first to last train and provides extra customer services.

The concourse has two sections separated by the shopping centre food court:

 The Elizabeth Street concourse has stairs and three escalators providing access to the street, a walkway to the Swanston Street concourse, a booking office, ticket barriers, toilets, and stairs and five escalators leading down to the platforms.
 The Swanston Street concourse was altered in the early 2000s, when redevelopment works were carried out at the adjacent Melbourne Central Shopping Centre. Inside the ticket barriers there are toilets, and two lifts and five escalators going to the platforms. Outside is a food court, an exit to La Trobe Street and Level LG of the shopping centre (which passes under Little Lonsdale Street). There is also a lift and four escalators to the shopping centre level above. On the next level up (Level G), there is access to Little Lonsdale and La Trobe Streets via the shopping centre. Access to Swanston Street is via three escalators rising another floor (or the lift to Level 1 and a 70m walk), and a walk through the shopping centre past the shot tower.

Platforms and services
Platform 1 - Clifton Group
 all stations and limited express services to Mernda
 all stations and limited express services to Hurstbridge

Platform 2 - Caulfield Group
 limited express services to Pakenham via Flinders Street
 limited express services to Cranbourne via Flinders Street

Platform 3 - Northern Group
 all stations services to Craigieburn
 all stations services to Upfield
 all stations and limited express services to Sunbury
Customers for Werribee or Williamstown services, change at Flinders Street, Southern Cross or North Melbourne

Platform 4 - Burnley Group
 all stations and limited express services to Lilydale
 all stations and limited express services to Belgrave
 all stations and limited express services to Glen Waverley
 weekday shoulder peak all stations and limited express services to Alamein

Transport links
Yarra Trams operates thirteen services via Melbourne Central station, on Swanston, Elizabeth, and La Trobe Streets.

Swanston Street
: East Coburg – South Melbourne Beach
: Melbourne University – East Malvern (operates as 3a on weekends and Public Holidays)
: Melbourne University – Malvern
: Moreland – Glen Iris
: Melbourne University – Kew
: Melbourne University – Brighton East
: Melbourne University – Carnegie
: Melbourne University – Camberwell

Elizabeth Street
: Coburg North – Flinders Street station
: West Maribyrnong – Flinders Street station
: Airport West – Flinders Street station

La Trobe Street
: St Vincent's Plaza – Central Pier
: City Circle Tram

Kinetic Melbourne operates four routes from Lonsdale Street (Melbourne Central side), under contract to Public Transport Victoria:
: to Bulleen
: to Westfield Doncaster
: to La Trobe University Bundoora Campus
: to Northland Shopping Centre

Kinetic Melbourne operates thirteen routes from Lonsdale Street (Myer side), under contract to Public Transport Victoria:
: to Queen Street
: to Queen Street
: to Queen Street
: to Queen Street
: to King Street
: to Spencer Street (Peak Hour only)
: to Queen Street
: to Spencer Street
: to Queen Street
 : to Spencer Street
 : to Spencer Street
 : to Spencer Street
 : to Spencer Street (Peak Hour only)

Kinetic Melbourne operates eleven routes from Swanston/Lonsdale Streets (QV), under contract to Public Transport Victoria:
: to Box Hill station
: to Ringwood North
: to Westfield Doncaster
: to The Pines Shopping Centre (Peak Hour only)
: to Donvale
: to Deep Creek Reserve (Doncaster East)
: to La Trobe University Bundoora Campus
 : to The Pines Shopping Centre
 : to Warrandyte
 : to Mitcham station
 : to The Pines Shopping Centre (Peak Hour only)

Gallery

References

External links

Melway map at street-directory.com.au

Buildings and structures in Melbourne City Centre
Premium Melbourne railway stations
Railway stations in Australia opened in 1981
Railway stations in the City of Melbourne (LGA)
Railway stations located underground in Melbourne